Pāia Elementary School is a public elementary school in Paia, Hawaii, operated by the Hawaii Department of Education (HIDOE). Its original building is listed in the National Register of Historic Places along with five other Maui elementary schools.

The school first opened in 1881 and its current campus opened in 1909. In 2019 the HIDOE had a proposal to build a two-story classroom building for programs to immerse students in the Hawaiian language. There would be eight classrooms inside.

References

External links
 Paia Elementary School
 Re: Paia Elementary School - New Classroom Building - Hawaii Department of Education

Public schools in Maui
Public elementary schools in Hawaii
School buildings on the National Register of Historic Places in Hawaii
National Register of Historic Places in Maui County, Hawaii
1881 establishments in Hawaii
Educational institutions established in 1881
Hawaii Register of Historic Places